My Name Is Buddy: Another Record by Ry Cooder is the thirteenth studio album by Ry Cooder. It is the second social-political concept album by Ry Cooder. The album is packaged in a small booklet that includes a brief story and drawing to accompany each song. Both the songs and the stories relate tales from the viewpoint of the characters, Buddy Red Cat, Lefty Mouse, and Reverend Tom Toad. The liner notes ask listeners/readers to join them as they "Journey through time and space in days of labor, big bosses, farm failures, strikes, company cops, sundown towns, hobos, and trains... the America of yesteryear."

Reception 

My Name is Buddy was widely reviewed in the mainstream media to a generally favorable reception (earning a score of 76 out of 100 at Metacritic) The album was particularly well received, however, in folk music circles, becoming a cover feature in Sing Out! and receiving a nomination for the Award for Best Contemporary Folk Album at the 50th Grammy Awards.

Track listing 
 "Suitcase in My Hand" (Ry Cooder) - 2:54
 Ry Cooder (vocal, guitar), Roland White (vocal), Joachim Cooder - drums), Paddy Moloney (whistle, uilleann pipes), Mike Seeger (banjo, fiddle)
 "Cat and Mouse" (Ry Cooder) - 5:02
 Ry Cooder (vocal, guitar), Van Dyke Parks (piano)
 "Strike!" (Ry Cooder) - 5:07
 Ry Cooder (vocals, guitar), Joachim Cooder (drums), Mike Seeger (fiddle, harmonica, jaw harp)
 "J. Edgar" (Ry Cooder) - 2:37
 Ry Cooder (vocal, guitar), Mike Seeger (banjo), Pete Seeger (banjo)
 "Footprints in the Snow" (Bill Monroe with new lyrics by Ry Cooder) - 3:07
 Ry Cooder (vocal, bajo sexto), Roland White (vocal, mandolin), René Camacho (bass), Joachim Cooder (drums), Flaco Jiménez (accordion), Van Dyke Parks (piano), Mike seeger (fiddle)
 "Sundown Town" (Ry Cooder, Joachim Cooder) - 2:57
 Terry Evans (vocal), Bobby King (vocal), Ry Cooder (guitar, bass), Jim Keltner (drums)
 "Green Dog" (Ry Cooder) - 7:33
 Ry Cooder (vocal, guitar), Juliette Commagere (vocal), Joachim Cooder (drums), Stefon Harris (vibes, marimba), Jacky Terrasson (piano)
 "The Dying Truck Driver" (Ry Cooder) - 4:56
 Ry Cooder (vocal, guitar), Roland White (vocal, mandolin), Mike Seeger (harmonica)
 "Christmas in Southgate" (Ry Cooder) - 3:27
 Ry Cooder (vocal, bajo sexto), René Camacho (bass), Joachim Cooder (drums), Flaco Jiménez (accordion), Van Dyke Parks (piano), Mike Seeger (fiddle), Roland White (mandolin)
 "Hank Williams" (Ry Cooder) - 4:09
 Ry Cooder (vocal, guitar), Joachim Cooder (drums), Mike Elizondo (bass)
 "Red Cat Till I Die" (Ry Cooder) - 3:08
 "The original Cardboard Avenue Jaywalkers": Buddy Red Cat (vocal, guitar), Lefty Mouse (fiddle), The Reverend Tom Toad (tambourine)
 "Three Chords and the Truth" (Ry Cooder, Joachim Cooder) - 5:02
 Ry Cooder (vocal, guitar, bass), Joachim Cooder (drums)
 "My Name Is Buddy" (Ry Cooder) 3:12
 Ry Cooder (vocal, mandolin, guitar, bass, keyboard), Joachim Cooder (drums)
 "One Cat, One Vote, One Beer" (Ry Cooder, Joachim Cooder, Jared Smith) - 4:15
 Ry Cooder (vocal), Joachim Cooder (keyboard, percussion), Jon Hassell (trumpet)
 "Cardboard Avenue" (Ry Cooder) - 4:33
 Ry Cooder (vocal, banjo), Joachim Cooder (percussion), Mike Elizondo (bass), Jim Keltner (drums), Mike Seeger (fiddle), Roland White (mandolin)
 "Farm Girl" (Ry Cooder) - 3:54
 Ry Cooder (vocal, guitar), Juliette Commagere (vocal), Mike Elizondo (bass), Jim Keltner (drums), Mike Seeger (fiddle), Roland White (mandolin)
 "There's a Bright Side Somewhere" (Traditional with new lyrics by Ry Cooder) - 4:49
 Ry Cooder (vocal, guitar), Mike Elizondo (bass), Flaco Jiménez (accordion), Jim Kelter (drums), Paddy Moloney (whistle), Van Dyke Parks (piano), Mike Seeger (fiddle)

Personnel

Musicians 
See track listing above

Production 
 Recorded by Don Smith at Sound City Studios, Van Nuys, California
 Additional recording by Sunny D. Levine at Orange Stella Studio, Santa Monica, California and in Beacon, New York; Martin Pradler at Chateau Martin, Los Angeles
 Mixdown by Don Smith and Martin Pradler at Sound City Studios
 Mastering by Martin Pradler
 Production assistant: Aisha Ayers

Artwork 
 Illustrations by Vincent Valdez
 Photographs by Susan Titelman
 Package Design: Martin Pradler and Ry Cooder

Charts

Releases

References

Further reading / listening 
 "Cooder's Buddy Revives Tales of Bygone America", Morning Edition, NPR, March 6, 2007
 "From the Dust", The Observer, March 4, 2007

External links 
 My Name is Buddy, site at Nonesuch Records

2007 albums
Ry Cooder albums
Concept albums
Albums produced by Ry Cooder
Albums recorded at Sound City Studios